Kadenang Kristal (International title: Crystal Chain) is a Philippine television drama series broadcast by GMA Network. Directed by Gina Alajar, it stars Amy Austria, Maricel Laxa, Rio Locsin, Jackie Lou Blanco and Teresa Loyzaga. It premiered on July 31, 1995. The series concluded on August 9, 1996 with a total of 268 episodes.

Cast and characters

Lead cast
 Amy Austria as Kristal
 Jackie Lou Blanco as Elizabeth
 Maricel Laxa as Aileen
 Rio Locsin as Lolita
 Teresa Loyzaga as Teresita "Sita"

Supporting cast
 Angelica Panganiban as Mariella
 Lady Lee as Anya
 Patricia Ann Roque as Nadia
 Karina "Kara" Cruz as Luisa
 Sarah Jane Abad as Ruth
 Luz Valdez as Amelia
 Ernie Garcia
 Tanya Gomez
 Roy Alvarez
 Julie Fe Navarro
 Janus del Prado
 Jefferson Long

Accolades

References

1995 Philippine television series debuts
1996 Philippine television series endings
Filipino-language television shows
GMA Network drama series
Television series by TAPE Inc.
Television shows set in the Philippines